Julie Cooper also refer to:

 Julie Cooper (politician) (born 1960), British Labour Party Member of Parliament
 Julie Cooper (EastEnders), character from the British soap EastEnders
 Julie Cooper (Home and Away), character from the Australian soap Home and Away
 Julie Cooper (The O.C.), character from the U.S. TV series The O.C.

See also
 Julia Cooper Mack (1920–2014), American judge